León Gawaran Guinto Sr. (June 28, 1886 – July 10, 1962) was a public servant in the Philippines from the Commonwealth period up to the post-war era, best remembered as the war-time Mayor of the City of Greater Manila in the Philippines.

Early life
Guinto was born to Juan P. Guinto and Pia Gawaran in the village of San Nicolas in Bacoor, Cavite province. He completed his early education from his home town and earned his college degree from the Colegio de San Juan de Letran. He first got work at the Weather Bureau, married Marta Montes from Atimonan, Tayabas Province (now Quezon). The union produced three sons and two daughters.

By 1916, Guinto left his job at the Weather Bureau to pursue law studies at the old Escuela de Derecho and by 1920, after completing his law studies and qualifying as a bona fide lawyer, Guinto was employed as private secretary to the then Senate President, Manuel L. Quezon.

Government service

Pre-World War II
Guinto, after serving briefly as private secretary to Senate President Manuel L. Quezon, launched his political career in 1922 by running as member of the Provincial Board of the then Tayabas Province, the home province of his wife Marta Montes.

By 1925, he pursued the position of representative of the 2nd district of Tayabas under the Lower House of the Philippine Legislature. He held the post of legislator for six years until 1928.

He was elected provincial governor of Tayabas in 1928 but his term was cut short when he was appointed as Commissioner of Public Safety by then American Governor-General Theodore Roosevelt Jr. In the later part of 1933, Governor-General Frank Murphy named undersecretary of the Interior Department. By 1934, the Departments of Interior and Labor were merged and Guinto continued to serve as undersecretary.

In 1940, Guinto was appointed Secretary of Labor in the Commonwealth government of President Manuel L. Quezon.

Greater Manila's war-time mayor
By 1942, Guinto was appointed by Jorge B. Vargas, the then incoming chairman of the Japanese-created government structure called the Philippine Executive Commission, to assume the position of mayor of City of Greater Manila and look after the city's administration during the Japanese occupation during World War II. Guinto's close relations with the labor sector proved useful to his administration of Greater Manila, of which a number of labor leaders served as heads of the city government departments. He held the position until the city's disestablishment in 1944.

In 1945, Guinto was indicted as a war criminal for collaborating with the Japanese forces. A blanket amnesty was issued before the granting of Philippine Independence on July 4, 1946, sparing the former Manila mayor of a war crimes trial.

Post-World War II
Guinto went into the private sector, taught in the academe and even served as Dean of the College of Arts and Sciences of the Lyceum of the Philippines University.

In 1955, Guinto returned home to Quezon Province and was elected governor, only to lose re-election in 1959.

Death
Guinto died in 1962 at the age of 76 in Manila, Philippines.

Legacy
Leon Guinto Street (formerly Pennsylvania Street), which runs through the Ermita and Malate districts, was renamed in his honor.

References
By Sword and Fire: The Destruction of Manila in World War II, 3 February-3 March 1945, by Alphonso J. Aluit (1994) Bookmark, Inc. © 1994 National Commission for Culture and the Arts.

External links
The City of Manila

|-

|-

|-

|-

|-

1896 births
1962 deaths
Colegio de San Juan de Letran alumni
Filipino collaborators with Imperial Japan
Mayors of Manila
Lyceum of the Philippines University
Governors of Quezon
Members of the House of Representatives of the Philippines from Quezon
Members of the House of Representatives of the Philippines from Manila
Secretaries of Labor and Employment of the Philippines
People from Bacoor
Burials at the Manila South Cemetery
Quezon administration cabinet members
Nacionalista Party politicians
Members of the National Assembly (Second Philippine Republic)
Members of the Philippine Legislature